Gianmarco Vannucchi (born 30 July 1995) is an Italian footballer who plays as a goalkeeper for  side Taranto.

Club career
As a product of Juventus, Vannuchi never made his first team debut, the Torino club loaned him to Pro Vercelli, and later Renate. In 2015, Lega Pro side Alessandria signed him, he made his professional debut on 11 July 2015, in the 10th round of 2015–16 season against Pro Patria, he became the constant member of the starting team for the rest of the season. In the summer of 2018, Serie B side Salernitana signed him for an undisclosed fee.

On 27 August 2020 he became a new Padova player.

References

External links
 
 
 

1995 births
Living people
People from Prato
Sportspeople from the Province of Prato
Association football goalkeepers
Italian footballers
Serie B players
Serie C players
Juventus F.C. players
F.C. Pro Vercelli 1892 players
A.C. Renate players
U.S. Alessandria Calcio 1912 players
U.S. Salernitana 1919 players
Calcio Padova players
Taranto F.C. 1927 players
Footballers from Tuscany